McDaniel Heights is an unincorporated community in New Castle County, Delaware, United States. McDaniel Heights is located east of U.S. Route 202 between Fairfax and Talleyville.

References

External links

Unincorporated communities in New Castle County, Delaware
Unincorporated communities in Delaware